Saint John the Baptist Cathedral is the mother church of the Roman Catholic Diocese of Fresno, located at 2814 Mariposa Street, in Fresno, California.  The parish was established in 1882.  In 1878, Catholic settlers in the area recognized the need for a church and began to raise funds.  The Central Pacific Railroad donated two lots and Bishop Francisco Mora y Borrell of the Diocese of Monterey-Los Angeles purchased two adjacent lots.  Construction on the sanctuary began early in 1880 and the structure was completed in November.  Bishop Mora dedicated the church to St. John the Baptist on May 21, 1882.  It was a brick structure with a  steeple and served the five Catholic families in the area.

By 1902, the congregation outgrew its home and began plans for a larger building.  After Easter services on March 30, workers began to demolish the old building with the intent of constructing a new church on the same site.  However, the pastor insisted on a new site at Mariposa and R Streets.  Although parishioners complained that the proposed site was beyond the edge of town, the pastor prevailed.  The cornerstone was laid August 3, 1902 and Archbishop George Montgomery dedicated the new sanctuary June 7, 1903.

The church was designed in a Gothic-Romanesque style by Thomas Bermingham and constructed of red brick. The facade features a triple entry framed by two square towers with spires.  Above the entry is a small rose window.

When the Diocese of Monterey-Fresno was split from the Diocese of Los Angeles-San Diego in 1922, St. John's was selected as the cathedral for the new Diocese.  When Monterey and Fresno were further split in 1967, St. John's became the seat of the new Bishop of Fresno.

See also
List of Catholic cathedrals in the United States
List of cathedrals in the United States

References

External links 
Cathedral website
Diocese of Fresno website 

Religious organizations established in 1882
Roman Catholic churches completed in 1903
John Fresno
Culture of Fresno, California
Tourist attractions in Fresno, California
Churches in Fresno, California
20th-century Roman Catholic church buildings in the United States